Salem Methodist Episcopal Church is a historic church located at 244 S. Broadway in Salem, Ohio.

It was built in 1910 and added to the National Register in 1995.

References

Churches on the National Register of Historic Places in Ohio
Churches completed in 1910
Buildings and structures in Columbiana County, Ohio
National Register of Historic Places in Columbiana County, Ohio
United Methodist churches in Ohio